Eleutheromenia is a genus of cavibelonian solenogasters, a kind of shell-less, worm-like mollusk.

Species
There are 2 species:

 Eleutheromenia carinata Salvini-Plawen & Öztürk, 2006
 Eleutheromenia sierra (Pruvot, 1890)

References

Cavibelonia